Gomant Vibhushan Award  is the highest civilian honour of the State of Goa. It is given annually by Government of Goa to people of Goan origin for exceptional work in any field.

The award was instituted by Goa Directorate of Art and Culture, Government of Goa. It is presented by the Governor of Goa at a public function, and carries a memento, which is a glass-encased traditional brass lamp, a citation and  5 lakhs, as a monetary award.

Awardees

References

External links
 

Government of Goa
Awards established in 2010
Goan society
Civil awards and decorations of Goa